This is a list of notable theorems. Lists of theorems and similar statements include:
List of fundamental theorems
List of lemmas
List of conjectures
List of inequalities
List of mathematical proofs
List of misnamed theorems

Most of the results below come from pure mathematics, but some are from theoretical physics, economics, and other applied fields.



0–9
2-factor theorem (graph theory)
15 and 290 theorems (number theory)
2π theorem (Riemannian geometry)

A

B

C

D

E

F

G

H

I

J

K

L

M

N

O

P

Q

R

S

T

U

V

W

Z

Theorems